Sojuela is a municipality of the autonomous community of La Rioja (Spain). It is located near the capital, Logroño.  Its population in January 2006 was 124 inhabitants over a 15.15 square kilometre area.

References

Municipalities in La Rioja (Spain)